M. S. Raju is an Indian film producer, screenwriter, and director who works in Telugu cinema. He is the founder and owner of the film production company Sumanth Art Productions. He won three Filmfare Awards  becoming the first producer to receive three consecutive Filmfare Awards  for the films Okkadu (2003), Varsham (2004), and Nuvvostanante Nenoddantana (2005). He also produced the successful films Sathruvu (1991), Devi (1999), Manasantha Nuvve (2001), and Nee Sneham (2002).

Early life
M. S. Raju's father Rayaparaju owned hundreds of acres of land in erstwhile West Godavari district of Andhra Pradesh. Rayaparaju sold all the properties there and migrated to Madras. Producer Arjuna Raju of Roja Movies is a cousin of his father. Inspired by him, his father became a film producer and made five to six films.

Career 
M. S. Raju was interested in films right from his childhood. After completing his education, he started his career in films with the help of a friend. He made a film titled Manavadostunnadu (1987) with Arjun and Sobhana in the lead roles. His father's good will helped him in getting financiers.

He established a new production company called 'Sumanth Arts' named after his son. The first film made on the banner was Sathruvu (1991) starring Venkatesh, Vijayashanti, and Kota Srinivasa Rao and directed by Kodi Ramakrishna. M. S. Raju himself provided the basic story idea of the film and Satyamurthy was roped in as a writer to develop the storyline. The film was also dubbed into Tamil. Sathruvu was commercially successful in both Telugu and Tamil.

His next film was Police Lock-up (1993) starring Vijayashanti in a dual role. Police Lock-up also became a big hit. The Tamil dubbed version of the film was also successful. His next film was Street Fighter starring Vijayashanti with B. Gopal as the director. Street Fighter was a box-office disaster.

Personal life 
M. S. Raju has two children  son Sumanth Ashwin and daughter Rishita. Rishita was born before the release of Devi (1999) and there is 11-year gap between Sumanth and Rishita. Sumanth Ashwin made his acting debut with the film Tuneega Tuneega (2012), under M. S. Raju's direction.

Filmography

As producer 

Manavadostunnadu (1987)
Sathruvu (1991)
Police Lockup (1993)
Street Fighter (1994)
Devi (1999)
Devi Putrudu (2001)
Manasantha Nuvve (2001)
Nee Sneham (2002)
Okkadu (2003)
Varsham (2004)
Nuvvostanante Nenoddantana (2005)
Pournami (2006)
Aata (2007)
Vaana (2008)
Maska (2009)

As director 
Vaana (2008)
Tuneega Tuneega (2012)
Dirty Hari (2020)
 7 Days 6 Nights (2022)

Awards
Filmfare Awards
Filmfare Best Film Award (Telugu) - Okkadu (2003)
Filmfare Best Film Award (Telugu) - Varsham (2004)
Filmfare Best Film Award (Telugu) - Nuvvostanante Nenoddantana (2005)

Nandi Awards
Nandi Award for Best Feature Film - Okkadu (2003)
Nandi Award for Best Feature Film - Nuvvostanante Nenoddantana (2005)

References

External links

Living people
Telugu film producers
21st-century Indian film directors
Indian film directors
Film directors from Andhra Pradesh
People from Andhra Pradesh
Filmfare Awards South winners
Indian film producers
Film producers from Andhra Pradesh
Telugu film directors
Nandi Award winners
1958 births